Dubar is a surname. Notable people with the surname include:

 Claude Dubar (1945–2015), French sociologist
 Pat Dubar, American singer